Mulawad  is a village in the southern state of Karnataka, India. It is located in the Kolhar taluk of Vijayapura district in Karnataka.Mulwad is village located near a famous Historical City Vijaypur and Basavan Bagewadi .

Demographics
 India census, Mulawad had a population of 6383 with 3240 males and 3143 females.

See also
 Bijapur district
 Districts of Karnataka

References

External links
 http://Bijapur.nic.in/

Villages in Bijapur district, Karnataka